Kuna may refer to:

Places
 Kuna, Idaho, a town in the United States
 Kuna Caves, a lava tube in Idaho
 Kuna Peak, a mountain in California
 , a village in the Orebić municipality, Croatia
 , a village in the Konavle municipality, Croatia
 , a river in Alaska North Slope
 , in Venezuela and Guyana
 
 
 
 , also called

People with the surname 
 Henryk Kuna (1885–1945), Polish sculptor
 Kuna Srisailam Goud (born 1965), Indian politician
 Ladislav Kuna (1947–2012), Slovak football player

Ships 

 Kuna (icebreaker), the oldest river icebreaker still in service in the world

Other uses
 Kuna people, an indigenous people of Panama
 Kuna language, a language spoken by the Kuna people
 Croatian kuna, a former currency
 Kuna (company), a cryptocurrency exchange in Ukraine

See also
 KUNA (disambiguation)
 Kune (disambiguation)
 Kuny (disambiguation)